Lord Nelson class may refer to:
 
 SR Lord Nelson-class steam locomotive